Lake Worth Community High School is a public high school located in Lake Worth Beach, Florida. Established in 1922 as Lake Worth High School, it is currently one of Palm Beach County's largest schools.

The Palm Beach County School Board added the word Community to the names of all public high schools, including Lake Worth High School, in the 1980s.

Academics
Lake Worth Community High School has many Advanced Placement and [AICE] courses as well as many honors courses.

English
Four Credits of English are required. English 1 is offered all the way up to AP English Language and Literature.

Social Studies
One credit of World History, one credit of American History, 0.5 credit of Economics, and 0.5 credit of Government are required to graduate. World history is usually taken during sophomore year, American history during junior year, and economics and government is taken during senior year.

Math
Four Credits of Math are required to graduate. Algebra 1, Geometry, Algebra II, Pre-Calculus, AP Calculus AB, AP Calculus BC, and AP Statistics are offered.

Science
Three Credits of Science are needed to graduate. Integrated Science I (formerly known as Earth Sciences), Biology, Chemistry, Anatomy & Physiology, Physics, Environmental Science, Integrated Science I & II.
Some courses are also available in AP version.

Foreign Languages
Foreign Language is required to graduate high school. At least two credits are required for college acceptance. Spanish and French are both offered from Spanish and French 1 up to AP Spanish Language and Literature and AP French Language.

Choice Academies 
Lake Worth Community High School has seven Choice Academies.

 3DE by Junior Achievement
 Air Force JROTC
 Criminal Justice
 Culinary Arts
 Drafting and Design
 Early Childhood
 Medical Science / Biomedical Sciences

The school also has one in-house Academy which is Construction Technology.

Athletics
The Lake Worth Community High School mascot is the Trojan (Troy Trojan) and the colors are Maroon, Silver and White. The current Athletic Director is Frank Baxley.

Trojan Athletics include:
 Baseball
 Basketball - Girls & Boys
 Bowling- Girls & Boys
 Cheerleading
 Cross Country - Girls & Boys
 Football - Boys
 Flag Football - Girls
 Golf - Girls & Boys
 Soccer - Girls & Boys
 Softball
 Swimming - Girls & Boys
 Tennis - Girls & Boys
 Track and Field - Girls & Boys
 Volleyball - Girls & Boys
 Water Polo - Girls & Boys
 Weightlifting - Girls & Boys
 Wrestling

Lake Worth has a long running crosstown rivalry with the Atlantic Community High School Eagles, the Santaluces Community High School Chiefs, John I. Leonard Community High School Lancers and most recently the Park Vista Community High School Cobras.

Notable alumni
Daniel Cane, co-creator of Blackboard Learning Management Systems.
Mayo Smith, former Major League baseball player and manager (Class of 1932)
Mark Foley, former member of the United States House of Representatives (Class of 1973)
Deidre Hall and Andrea Hall, twin sisters; both stars of the soap opera Days of Our Lives (Class of 1965)
Herb Score, former MLB All-Star and 1955 American League Rookie of the Year for the Cleveland Indians and Chicago White Sox (Class of 1952)
Otis Thorpe, former Providence College Friar and NBA basketball player for the Kansas City Kings (Class of 1980)
Robert McKnight, former Florida State Senator and Representative (Class of 1962)
Scott Levy, professional wrestler known as Raven (Class of 1982)
Joe Looney, professional NFL football player for the [Dallas Cowboys] (Class of 2008)
LaVon Brazill, Former American football player (National Football League - NFL) with the Indianapolis colts (Class of 2007)
Stanley Shakespeare, Former American football player (National Football League - NFL)
Scott Henderson, award-winning jazz guitarist (Class of 1972)
James Looney, NFL player

References

External links
Lake Worth High School Alumni Foundation
Lake Worth Dollars for Scholars (DFS)
School District of Palm Beach County (SDPBC)

Buildings and structures in Lake Worth Beach, Florida
High schools in Palm Beach County, Florida
Educational institutions established in 1922
Public high schools in Florida
1922 establishments in Florida